Clement Junior James (born 10 March 1981) is an English retired semi-professional footballer who made one appearance in the Football League for Brentford as a left winger. After his release in 2000, he embarked on a career in non-League football.

Career

Brentford 
A left winger or forward, James began his career in the youth system at Brentford and signed a one-year professional contract at the end of the 1998–99 season. He made one appearance for the club, as a late substitute for Lloyd Owusu during a 1–0 Second Division defeat to Stoke City on 8 April 2000. James was released in May 2000 and the 8 minutes he spent on the pitch on his debut makes his one of the shortest Brentford first team careers.

Non-League football 
James joined Isthmian League Premier Division club Slough Town on loan in August 2000 and returned to Arbour Park on a permanent basis in August 2001, but suffered a ruptured anterior cruciate ligament in pre-season friendly versus Maidenhead United in 2002. He reunited with his former Slough Town manager Steve Browne at Isthmian League First Division North club Boreham Wood in June 2003. James followed Browne out of Meadow Park when Browne was sacked in January 2004. He finished the 2003–04 season with Burnham, before joining Hayes in time for the beginning of the 2004–05 season. James scored one goal in four appearances before being released in September 2004 and after a brief spell with Hemel Hempstead Town, he moved to Staines Town in February 2005. He remained with Staines Town until 2008 and briefly played for Enfield Town, before moving to Kingstonian in early 2009. He played seven games for the Ks before leaving on 27 July 2009.

Career statistics

References

External links

1981 births
Living people
English footballers
Brentford F.C. players
Slough Town F.C. players
Boreham Wood F.C. players
Burnham F.C. players
Hayes F.C. players
Staines Town F.C. players
Enfield Town F.C. players
Kingstonian F.C. players
English Football League players
Association football wingers
Association football forwards
Hemel Hempstead Town F.C. players
Isthmian League players
Southern Football League players
National League (English football) players
People from Bracknell